Hollywood is a city in southern Broward County, Florida, United States, located between Fort Lauderdale and Miami. As of 2020 census, Hollywood had a population of 153,061, and an estimated population of 153,131 in 2021. Founded in 1925, the city grew rapidly in the 1950s and 1960s, and is now the 12th-largest city in Florida. Hollywood is a principal city of the Miami metropolitan area, which was home to 6,138,333 people in the 2020 census, and an estimated 6,091,747 in 2021.

History

In 1920, Joseph Young arrived in South Florida to create his own "Dream City in Florida". His vision included the beaches of the Atlantic Ocean stretching westward with man-made lakes, infrastructure, roads, and the Intracoastal Waterway. He wanted to include large parks, schools, churches, and golf courses; these were all industries and activities that were very important to Young's life. After Young spent millions of dollars on the construction of the city, he was elected as the first mayor in 1925. This new town quickly became home to northerners known as "snowbirds", who fled the north during the winter and then escaped the south during the summer to avoid the harsh weather.  By 1960, Hollywood had more than 2,400 hotel units and  12,170 single-family homes. Young bought up thousands of acres of land around 1920, and named his new town "Hollywood by the Sea" to distinguish it from his other real-estate venture, "Hollywood in the Hills", in New York.

The Florida guide, published by the Federal Writers' Project, describes the early development of Hollywood, an early example of a planned community that proliferated in Florida during the real-estate boom of the 1920s:

Prospective purchasers of land were enticed by free hotel accommodation and entertainment, and "were driven about the city-to-be on trails blazed through palmetto thickets; so desolate and forlorn were some stretches that many women became hysterical, it is said, and a few fainted. Young had a vision of having lakes, golf courses, a luxury beach hotel (Hollywood Beach Hotel, now Hollywood Beach Resort), country clubs, and a main street, Hollywood Boulevard. After the 1926 Miami hurricane, Hollywood was severely damaged; local newspapers reported that Hollywood was second only to Miami in losses from the storm. Following Young's death in 1934, the city encountered other destructive hurricanes, and the stock market crashed with personal financial misfortunes.

Hurricane Irma hit Florida in 2017, wreaking widespread damage. Due to the spontaneity of the hurricane, nearly 700 elderly nursing-home residents died. In an investigation following the hurricane, some of the deaths were found to be not actually a result of the hurricane, but the poor conditions to which they were exposed in the aftermath. Four nursing-home staff charged with negligence and counts of manslaughter. Following the damage inflicted by Hurricane Irma in 2017, an initiative called Rebuild Florida was created by the Florida Department of Economic Opportunity to provide aid to citizens affected by the natural disaster. The initial focus of Rebuild Florida was its Housing Repair Program, which offered assistance in rebuilding families' homes that were impacted by Hurricane Irma. The program gave priority to low-income vulnerable residents, such as the disabled, the elderly, and those families with children under five. The success of this program has various results across the city, with hundreds of citizens claiming they were left without help.

Timeline

 1921 – Hollywood by the Sea platted on land of Joseph Wesley Young
 1923 
 Hollywood Hotel opens. Later renamed the Park View Hotel when the Hollywood Beach Hotel opens.
 1925
 Hollywood incorporated
 Hollywood Police Department established
 Hollywood Boulevard Bridge built (approximate date)
 Joseph Wesley Young becomes mayor; C.H. Windham becomes city manager
 Joseph Wesley Young House built
 1926
 Hollywood Beach Hotel in business
 September 18: 1926 Miami hurricane demolished city
 1928 – Port Everglades opened near Hollywood
 1930
 Hollywood Hills Inn built
 Population: 2,689.
 1932 – Riverside Military Academy Hollywood campus established
 1935 – Fiesta Tropicale began
 1937 – Florida Theatre built
 1947 – Hurricanes occur
 1948 – Broward County International Airport opened
 1950 – Population: 14,351
 1952 – Joseph Watson became city manager (until c. 1970)
 1953 – Hollywood Memorial Hospital opened
 1957
 Seminole Tribe of Florida gained official recognition by the federal government, with tribal headquarters located in Hollywood.
 McArthur High School opened
 1958 – Diplomat Hotel in business
 1959 – Seminole Tribe's Okalee Indian Village in business.
 1960 – Population: 35,237
 1962 – Arrow Drive-In cinema in business
 1964 – Home Federal Tower hi-rise built.
 1967 – Hollywood West Elks Lodge founded
 1970 – Population: 106,873
 1971
 Pageant of the Unconquered Seminoles held in Hollywood
 Topeekeegee Yugnee Park opened
 1972 – Broward County Historical Commission established 
 1974 – Broward County Library System established.
 1975 – Art and Culture Center of Hollywood opened
 1981
 July 27: Murder of Adam Walsh
 "U.S. Supreme Court affirms Tribe's right to high-stakes bingo at Hollywood in Seminole Tribe of Florida vs. Butterworth"
 1982 – West Lake Park opened
 1983 – Seminole Tribune newspaper begins publication.
 1996
 Kolb Nature Center opened in West Lake Park
 City website online (approximate date)
 1997 – New Times Broward-Palm Beach newspaper began publication
 2004 – Seminole Tribe of Florida's Seminole Hard Rock Hotel & Casino Hollywood in business
 2010 – Population: 140,768
 2013 – Frederica Wilson became U.S. representative for Florida's 24th congressional district
 2016 – Josh Levy became mayor
 2018 - The first hotel in almost 50 years, Circ By Sonder, opens in Downtown Hollywood.
 2019 – Hard Rock Live guitar shaped hotel opened

Geography

It is bounded by these municipalities:

Neighborhoods

These neighborhoods and communities are officially recognized by the City of Hollywood:

 441 Corridor
 Alandco
 Arapahoe Farms
 Beverly Hills
 Beverly Park
 Boulevard Heights
 Camino Sheridan
 Carriage/Carriage Hills
 Central Business District
 Condo presidents
 Downtown Hollywood
 Driftwood/Driftwood Acres
 East Lake
 Emerald Hills
 Emerald Oaks
 Emerald Point
 Estates of Fort Lauderdale
 Highland Gardens
 Hillcrest
 Hollywood Beach
 Hollywood Gardens
 Hollywood Hills
 Hollywood Lakes
 Hollywood North Beach
 Hollywood South Central Beach
 L'Etoile at Emerald Point
 Lake Eden
 Lakes of Emerald Hills
 Lawnacres
 Liberia
 Mapleridge
 Martin Luther King Jr. Community
 North Central
 Oak Point
 Oakridge
 Oakwood Hills
 Park East
 Park Side
 Playland/Playland Village
 Playland Estates
 Quadomain
 Royal Poinciana
 Sheridan Oaks
 Stirling Commercial
 The Homes at East Lake
 The Townhouses of Emerald Hills
 The Wood of Emerald Hills
 T.Y. (Topeekeegee Yugnee) Park
 Washington Park
 West Hollywood

Climate

Hollywood has a tropical rainforest climate (Köppen climate classification Af), with long, hot, humid, and rainy summers and short, warm, and dry winters.

Demographics

2020 census

As of the 2020 United States census, 153,067 people, 55,172 households, and 36,273 families resided in the city.

2010 census

As of 2000, of 59,673 households,  24.9% had children under 18 living with them, 41.5% were married couples living together, 11.9% had a female householder with no husband present, and 42.2% were not families. About 34.4% of all households were made up of individuals, and 13.1% had someone living alone who was 65 or older.  The average household size was 2.31, and the average family size was 3.00.

The city's age distribution was 21.3% under 18, 7.0% from 18 to 24, 31.3% from 25 to 44, 23.1% from 45 to 64, and 17.3% who were 65 or older. The median age was 39 years. For every 100 females, there were 94.1 males.  For every 100 women 18 and over, there were 90.9 men.

The median income for a household in the city was $40,714, and for a family was $55,849. Males had a median income of $33,102 versus $21,237 for females. The per capita income for the city was $22,097.  About 9.9% of families and 13.2% of the population were below the poverty line, including 18.1% of those under age 18 and 11.8% of those age 65 or over.

As of 2000, speakers of English as a first language accounted for 66.94% of residents, Spanish accounted for 21.62%, French made up 2.06%, French Creole consisted of 1.32%, Italian comprised 1.12%, Romanian was at 0.91%, Hebrew at 0.88%, Portuguese 0.84%, and German as a mother tongue was 0.72% of the population.

As of 2000, Hollywood had the 75th-highest percentage of Cuban residents in the U.S., at 4.23% of the city's population, and the 65th-highest percentage of Colombian residents in the US, at 2.26% of the city's population (tied with both the town and village of Mount Kisco, New York.) It also had the fifty-seventh highest percentage of Peruvian residents in the US, at 1.05% of the city's population (tied with Locust Valley, New York), and the 20th-highest percentage of Romanian residents in the US, at 1.1% of its population (tied with several other areas in the US).

Economy

Prior to their dissolutions, Commodore Cruise Line and its subsidiary Crown Cruise Line had their headquarters in Hollywood.

Aerospace and electronics parts manufacturer HEICO has its headquarters in Hollywood.

Since 1991, the Invicta Watch Group, a manufacturer and marketer of timepieces and writing instruments, has had its headquarters in Hollywood, where it also operates its customer-service call center.

Top employers

According to the city's 2019 Comprehensive Annual Financial Report, the top employers in the city are:

Tourism

Guided tours along the Intercostal Waterway are common in Hollywood. The waterway, parallel to the Atlantic Ocean, provides both tourists and locals with the exploration of nature and observation of surroundings.

Young Circle is another area surrounded by shops, restaurants, and bars. A Food-Truck Takeover occurs every Monday, during which dozens of local food trucks park and offer a variety of cuisines, including Cuban, Venezuelan, Mediterranean, Mexican, Jamaican, and Peruvian foods, in addition to barbecue, burgers, gourmet grilled cheese, and desserts.

Parks and recreation

Hollywood has about 60 parks, seven golf courses, and sandy beaches.

Hollywood Beach has a broadwalk that extends about 2.5 miles along the Atlantic Ocean. Parking is available on side streets or in parking garages for a fee, and public trolleys run through the day. Restaurants and hotels line the broadwalk, along with a theatre, children's playground, and other attractions, including bicycle-rental shops, ice-cream parlors, souvenir shops, and a farmer's market. The broadwalk is used for walking and jogging, and has a bike lane for bicyclists and rollerbladers.

Government

Mayor

 Joseph Wesley Young, circa 1925
 Arthur W. Kellner, circa 1935
 Lester Boggs, 1943–1947, 1949–1953
 Alfred G. Ryll, 1954–1955
 William G. Zinkil Sr., 1955–1957, 1959–1967
 E. L. McMorrough, c. 1959
 David Keating
 Mara Giulianti, circa 2002
 Peter Bober, circa 2016
 Josh Levy, 2016–present

Education

Hollywood has a diverse and broad number of educational institutions throughout the city, including 32 public (and charter) schools with 24 private schools. The public schools are operated by the Broward County Public Schools.

Public schools

Broward County operates 24 public schools, consisting of four high schools, six middle schools, and 14 elementary schools.

The public high schools situated in Hollywood are: Hollywood Hills High School, McArthur High School, South Broward High School, and Sheridan Technical College and High School.

The public middle schools include: Apollo Middle School, Attucks Middle School, Driftwood Middle School, McNicol Middle School, Olsen Middle School and Beachside Montessori Village.

The 14 elementary schools comprise:

 Mary M. Bethune Elementary School
 Beachside Montessori Village
 Boulevard Heights Elementary School
 Colbert Elementary School
 Driftwood Elementary School
 Hollywood Central Elementary School
 Hollywood Hills Elementary School
 Hollywood Park Elementary School 
 Oakridge Elementary School
 Orange Brook Elementary School
 Sheridan Hills Elementary School
 Sheridan Park Elementary School
 Stirling Elementary School
 West Hollywood Elementary School

Public (charter) schools

In addition to these public schools, eight public 'charter' schools operate independently from Broward County. They are: Hollywood Academy of Arts and Science (K–8), New Life Charter Academy, Championship Academy of Distinction at Hollywood K–5, Championship Academy of Distinction, Avant Garde Academy of Broward (K–12), BridgePrep Academy at Hollywood Hills, Ben Gamla Preparatory Academy and Bridge Prep Academy.

Private schools

Hollywood, Florida has an abundance of private schools scattered across the city. These are:
 Annunciation School
 Aukela Christian Military Academy
 Beacon Hill School
 Brauser Maimonides Academy
 Calvary Kids School
 Chaminade-Madonna College Preparatory School
 Covenant Teaching Fellowship School
 Ebony Village School
 First Presbyterian Pre-School
 Guidepost Montessori
 Hollywood Christian School
 Little Flower School
 Love Outreach Christian Academy
 Nativity Elementary School
 New Mirawood Elementary School
 Parkway Christian School
 Patty Cake Academy
 Pembroke Park Montessori School
 Phyls Academy
 Point of Grace Christian Academy
 Rainbow Montessori School
 Sheridan Hills Christian School
 St. Bernadette Catholic School
 Toddler Technology Academy

Infrastructure

Transportation

Hollywood is served by Fort Lauderdale-Hollywood International Airport, the 22nd busiest airport in the United States. Broward County Transit operates several bus routes that pass through the city of Hollywood, such as the 1 on US 1 (federal highway). It is also served by Tri-Rail stations at Sheridan Street and Hollywood.

Police department

The Hollywood Police Department is an entity within the city government tasked with law enforcement.

Notable people

 Davey Allison, former NASCAR driver
 Jayne Atkinson, actress, House of Cards
 Herbert L. Becker, former magician known as Kardeen, author, businessman
 Steve Blake, retired NBA player 
 Lauren Book, politician
 Ethan Bortnick, piano child prodigy
 Chris Britton, baseball pitcher, San Diego Padres
 Marquise Brown, NFL player
 Janice Dickinson, model, author
 Joe DiMaggio, iconic professional baseball player, lived and died in Hollywood
 Mike Donald, professional golfer
 Scotty Emerick, singer-songwriter
 Seth Gabel, actor
 Josh Gad, actor
 Adam Gaynor, former member of Matchbox Twenty
 Alan Gelfand, developer of Ollie (skateboarding trick)
 Michael Heverly, model
 Rosemary Homeister, Jr., jockey
 Erasmus James, defensive end in the NFL
 Evan Jenne, politician
 Victoria Justice, actress, model, singer
 Joe Klink, retired MLB pitcher
 Veronica Lake, actress, World War II pin-up girl
 Bethany Joy Lenz, actress, One Tree Hill
 Jeff Marx, composer and lyricist of Broadway musical Avenue Q
 Oddibe McDowell, MLB center fielder
 Bryant McFadden, cornerback for NFL's Pittsburgh Steelers
 Danny McManus, former CFL quarterback; broadcaster for TSN's CFL games
 Fred Melamed, actor
 Tracy Melchior, actress
 Billy Mitchell, videogame player
 Michael Mizrachi, professional poker player
 Mike Napoli, MLB catcher and first baseman, member of 2013 World Series champion Boston Red Sox
 Norman Reedus, actor
 Ian Richards, County Court Judge of Florida's 17th Judicial Circuit
 Patti Rizzo, golfer, 1982 LPGA Tour Rookie of the Year
 Jon Pernell Roberts, drug trafficker
 Latrice Royale, drag entertainer
 Jabaal Sheard, defensive end for Super Bowl LI champion New England Patriots
 Megan Timpf, Canadian softball player, competitor at 2008 Summer Olympics
 Joe Trohman, Fall Out Boy lead guitarist
 John Walsh, host of America's Most Wanted
 Scott Weinger, actor, writer, producer
 Robert Wexler, former member of the U.S. House of Representatives
 Lorenzo White, former Houston Oilers running back

Crime and terrorism

In popular culture

The television game show Hollywood Squares taped a week of shows at the historic Diplomat Hotel in 1987 and featured aerial footage shot over Hollywood, Florida.

Episode 15 of season six of the HBO crime drama The Sopranos featured scenes shot in the vicinity of the Hollywood Beach Marriott along Carolina Street.

The Art and Culture Center of Hollywood is the exterior of the police substation in the now-cancelled TV show The Glades.

The comedy series Big Time in Hollywood, FL is set in Hollywood, Florida.

Sister cities

 Lecheria, Venezuela
 Mollendo, Peru
 Ciudad de la Costa, Uruguay
 Guatemala City, Guatemala
 Herzliya, Israel
 Romorantin-Lanthenay, France
 Baia Mare, Romania
 Salvaleón de Higüey, Dominican Republic
 Comodoro Rivadavia, Argentina
 Vlorë, Albania

See also

 Big Time in Hollywood, FL

References

Bibliography

 
 
Florida, DK Eyewitness Travel Guides, 2004, pg. 132

External links

 
 Hollywood Office of Tourism
 
 
 Items related to Hollywood, various dates (via Digital Public Library of America)

 
1921 establishments in Florida
Beaches of Broward County, Florida
Beaches of Florida
Cities in Broward County, Florida
Cities in Florida
Populated coastal places in Florida on the Atlantic Ocean
Populated places established in 1921
Seaside resorts in Florida